The Opie Turner Open was a golf tournament on the LPGA Tour from 1958 to 1959. It was played at Turner's Lodge in Burneyville, Oklahoma.

Winners
1959 Betsy Rawls
1958 Mickey Wright

References

Former LPGA Tour events
Golf in Oklahoma
Women's sports in Oklahoma